Admiral Berens may refer to:

Mikhail Berens (1879–1943), Imperial Russian Navy rear admiral
Yevgeny Berens (1876–1928), Imperial Russian Navy vice admiral

See also
Bruce Beran (born 1935), U.S. Coast Guard vice admiral